The Olympus Sound is the fifth studio album by Irish power pop band Pugwash.  It features contributions from Ben Folds, Neil Hannon of The Divine Comedy, and Dave Gregory and Andy Partridge of XTC. Frontman Thomas Walsh wrote the track "Dear Belinda" as a birthday present for British actress Belinda Stewart-Wilson, and claimed Stewart-Wilson had requested to sing vocals on the final version of the song but she does not appear on the album.

Release and reception
The album was released in Ireland by 1969 Records and EMI on 19 August 2011. The iTunes version featured two bonus tracks not included on the CD. On its release, The Irish Times hailed it as "the best Irish album of the year to date" while Hot Press said it was "the best thing [Pugwash] has ever done". The Irish Daily Star named it among its top 10 Irish albums of 2011. It was nominated for the Choice Music Prize 2011, an award given to the best Irish album of the year, in January 2012.

After signing a three-year deal with British indie label Lojinx, The Olympus Sound was released outside Ireland on CD and vinyl on 16 April 2012. The CD version includes three bonus tracks not included on the original physical or iTunes releases.

Album title
The title of the album refers to the fact that Walsh recorded the initial demos for The Olympus Sound on an Olympus voice recorder and, instead of reworking them into more a polished form, was convinced by bandmate Tosh Flood to send them to him as they were. Flood then used the demos to record some instrumental parts, which ended up being used on the final version of the album.

Artwork
The cover artwork is taken from a 2010 painting called The Unseen, by British artists and married couple Emma Biggs and Matthew Collings.

Track listing

Personnel 

 Thomas Walsh: vocals, backing vocals, acoustic guitar, electric guitar, piano, Mellotron, Chamberlin, tubular bells, Solina Strings, drums, percussion, samples
 Tosh Flood: electric guitar, backing vocals, baritone bass guitar, Hammond organ, Mellotron, mandolin, piano, autoharp, acoustic guitar, Wurlitzer, spinet, harpsichord, Moog, vibraphone, pedal steel, 12 string acoustic guitar
 Shaun McGee: bass guitar, backing vocals
 Joe Fitzgerald: drums, percussion
 Neil Hannon: piano, Korg synth, Mellotron, harpsichord, backing vocals 
 Dave Gregory: Rhodes piano, string arrangement
 Ben Folds: piano
 Andy Partridge: backing vocals
 Dolores Flood: wish bell
 Michelle Mason: cello
 Fergal O'Dhornain: viola
 Katie O'Connor: violin
 Alvin Quatro: e-bow
 Fergal Davis: backing vocals

References 

2011 albums
Pugwash (band) albums